Palazzo Malenchini Alberti is a palace in Florence, Italy. It was owned by the Alberti, who had also a tower nearby.

Until the 15th century, their residence was formed by a series of different houses and workshops, which were unified in 1760-1763 by will of Giovan Vincenzo Alberti (1715-1788), a Florentine senator and minister to both Grand-Dukes Francis I and his son Peter Leopold. Later the palace was acquired by the Mori Ubaldini, and a new neo-Renaissance façade was added in 1849–1851.  After a short period under a French family, it went to marquess Luigi Malenchini from Livorno, whence the modern name.

The palace was damaged during World War II and by the 1966 Flood of the River Arno, and was later restored (2000-2003).

Sources

Malenchini Alberti